Krubong is a mukim and town in Melaka Tengah District, Malacca, Malaysia.

Economy 
 Krubong Industrial Park

Infrastructures 
 Hang Jebat Sports Complex
 Hang Jebat Stadium (Main stadium)
 Complex 10 Football Field
 Hang Jebat Aquatic Centre (Aquatic Centre equipped with Swimming and Diving pools)
 Hang Jebat Equestrian Centre
 Hang Jebat Lawn Bowl Centre
 Hang Jebat Squash Centre
 Malacca Chinese Mosque (A mosque dedicated for the State's Chinese Muslims)

References

Central Melaka District
Mukims of Malacca